This page explains the numbering and classification schemes for locomotives employed by the Japanese Government Railways, the Japanese National Railways and the Japan Railways Group.

Steam locomotives

Pre-nationalization 

Prior to the nationalization of Japanese railways in 1906 and 1907, the government-run railways had numbered their steam locomotives only with serial numbers without consideration of the types of the locomotives. From the beginning of the Kobe–Osaka railway in 1874, they allocated odd numbers to locomotives in Tokyo area and even numbers to locomotives in Kobe area, but this custom was not maintained after the completion of railway between Tokyo and Kobe in 1889. Later, some locomotives, such as Classes A8 and B6 and rack railway locomotives, were renumbered to make groups for easy recognition of classes.

Classes were introduced by Francis H. Trevithick (1850–1931), a grandson of Richard Trevithick, employed by the government of Japan for supervision of rolling stock management. He classified the locomotives with one Latin letter (A through Z), which was then expanded to use two letters (AB, AC, AD, and so on).

Later, this simple method was revised to use one letter and one or two digit numerals with consideration of locomotive types. The meanings of the letters were as follows:

A – Tank locomotives with two driving axles (A1–A10)
B – Tank locomotives with three driving axles (B1–B7)
C – Tank locomotives for rack railway (C1–C3)
D – Tender locomotives with two driving axles (D1–D12)
E – Tender locomotives with three driving axles (E1–E7)
F – Tender locomotives with four driving axles (F1–F2)

1909 numbering system

Following the railway nationalization, in 1909, the railway authority adopted a new system in which locomotives were numbered and classified by four-digit numerals. All existing locomotives were reclassified. Numbers 1 through 4999 were allocated for tank locomotives and 5000 through 9999 were allocated for tender locomotives. Here the classes and the numbers acquired a distinct relationship. Locomotives were grouped in numbers and the classes were represented by the earliest number of the group.

1–999 – Tank locomotives with two driving axles
1000–3999 – Tank locomotives with three driving axles (3900 and after for rack railway)
4000–4999 – Tank locomotives with four driving axles
5000–6999 – Tender locomotives with two driving axles
7000–8999 – Tender locomotives with three driving axles
9000–9999 – Tender locomotives with four and over driving axles

Numbers within a class were serial in principle. When the number overflowed (as in Classes 8620, 9600 and 9900), one digit was added to precede the four digits to make the numbers five digit. Class 18900 (later reclassified as Class C51) was exceptionally five digit from the beginning.

This numbering and classification rule survived the revision in 1928. Non-standard locomotives that joined the national railways by means of purchase of railway companies were numbered in accordance with this rule even after 1928. Locomotives numbered and classified under this rule includes the locomotives used until very last days of JNR steam locomotives in the 1970s.

1928 numbering system
Because the 1909 method was about to overflow, a new system of numbering and classification came into effect on October 1, 1928. Except for Classes 18900, 8200 and 9900 being reclassified as C51, C52 and D50 respectively, existing locomotives were not reclassified or renumbered. After this revision, steam locomotives were classified and numbered with a Latin letter and numerals.

 Example D62 3

Unlike electric and diesel locomotives, steam locomotive classifications do not include an indication of the type of power source (steam) in their class names.

 Number of driving axles
A letter indicates the number of driving axles. Number of either leading and trailing axles or axles of tenders is disregarded.
 2 axles – B
 3 axles – C
 4 axles – D
 5 axles – E

 Class
 Together with the letter representing the number of driving axles, a two-digit numeral following the letter indicates a class. The number distinguishes tank locomotives and tender locomotives.
 10–49 – Tank locomotives
 50–99 – Tender locomotives

According to this numbering method, D51 498 means locomotive number 498 of Class D51, which is a class of tender locomotives with four driving axles.

Electric locomotives

Pre-1928 numbering system
The national railways imported its first electric locomotives in 1912. Like steam locomotives of that period, electric locomotives were numbered with four or five digit numerals. Classes were represented by their earliest numbers, last digit being "0".

The table below lists all classes of the electric locomotives identified under this method.

1928 numbering system
A new system of numbering and classification came into effect in 1928. Originally, electric locomotives were classified by maximum speeds. High-speed locomotives were for passenger trains and low-speed locomotives were for freight trains. Later, the system was revised to distinguish the types of electricity when AC and AC/DC  locomotives were introduced.

 Example EF81 95

 E
All classes of electric locomotives begin with the letter "E" for "electric".

 Number of driving axles
A letter indicates the number of driving axles. Unpowered axles are disregarded.

 2 axles – B
 3 axles – C
 4 axles – D
 6 axles – F
 8 axles – H

 Class
Together with the letter "E" and the letter representing the number of driving axles, a two-digit numeral following the letters indicates a class. Originally, the number distinguished the three types of locomotives.
 10–39 - Locomotives with maximum speed 85 km/h or less
 40–49 - Locomotives for rack railway
 50–99 - Locomotives with maximum speed exceeding 85 km/h

As a result of a revision, as of 1987, the rule was as follows.
 10–29 - DC locomotives with maximum speed 85 km/h or less
 30–39 - AC/DC locomotives with maximum speed 85 km/h or less
 40–49 - AC locomotives with maximum speed 85 km/h or less
 50–69 - DC locomotives with maximum speed exceeding 85 km/h
 70–79 - AC locomotives with maximum speed exceeding 85 km/h
 80–89 - AC/DC locomotives with maximum speed exceeding 85 km/h
 90–99 - prototypes

 Running number
 In principle, running numbers begin with 1. However, numbers may be skipped to create subclasses, such as Class EF65 1000 or Class ED75 700.

According to this numbering method, EF81 95 means locomotive number 95 of Class EF81, which is a class of AC/DC locomotive with six driving axles and maximum speed exceeding 85 km/h.

JR Freight 
Out of seven Japan Railways Group (JR Group) companies established in 1987, only Japan Freight Railway Company (JR Freight) has built new electric locomotives. Initially JR Freight continued to build locomotives originally designed by JNR with minor modifications. However, in 1990, it created the new class of EF200, adopting a new classification system with three-digit class names. This system was also later adopted by East Japan Railway Company (JR East) when it introduced its version of the Class EF510 in 2010.

Example EH500-31

Usage of Roman letters is the same as the 1928 rule. A hyphen is placed between the class number and running number.

 Class
 Three digits of numerals are used to indicate classes. The classification by the maximum speed was replaced by the classification by the types of motors.
 100–199 - DC locomotives with DC motors
 200–299 - DC locomotives with AC motors
 300–399 - Other DC locomotives
 400–499 - AC/DC locomotives with DC motors
 500–599 - AC/DC locomotives with AC motors
 600–699 - Other AC/DC locomotives
 700–799 - AC locomotives with DC motors
 800–899 - AC locomotives with AC motors
 900–999 - Other AC locomotives

According to this numbering method, EH500-31 means locomotive number 31 of Class EH500, which is a class of AC/DC locomotive with eight driving axles and AC motors.

Diesel locomotives

JNR 
The history of diesel locomotives of the Japanese Government Railways started with two classes of German-made locomotives, the diesel-electric Class DC11 in 1929 and the diesel-mechanical DC10 in 1930. The Ministry of Railways numbered them in accordance with the similar system as it then used for steam and electric locomotives. The Japanese National Railways continued with this system.

 Example  DD13 1

 D
All classes of diesel locomotives begin with the letter "D" for "Diesel".

 Number of driving axles
 A letter indicates the number of driving axles. Unpowered axles are disregarded.
 3 axles – C
 4 axles – D
 5 axles – E
 6 axles – F

 Class
 Together with the letter "D" and the letter representing the number of driving axles, a two-digit numeral following the letters indicates a class. The number distinguishes the locomotives by the maximum speeds.
 10–39 - Locomotives with maximum speed 85 km/h or less
 40–49 - Prototypes
 50–89 - Locomotives with maximum speed exceeding 85 km/h
 90–99 - Prototypes

 Running number
 Same as for electric locomotives.

According to this numbering method, DD13 1 means locomotive number 1 of Class DD13, which is a class of diesel locomotive with four driving axles and maximum speed 85 km/h or less.

JR Freight 
After the privatization of JNR in 1987, two Japan Railways Group (JR Group) companies created new classes of diesel locomotives. East Japan Railway Company (JR East) classified its new class as DD19, using the JNR classification system, as it was only a rebuild of the Class DD17, which was built by JNR. On the other hand, Japan Freight Railway Company (JR Freight) built completely new diesel locomotives, which were classified using a new system with three-digit class names.

 Example  DF200-7

Usage of Roman letters is the same as for JNR usage. A hyphen is placed between the class number and running number.

 Class
 Three digits of numerals are used to indicate classes. The classification by the maximum speed was replaced by the classification by the forms of power transmission and types of electric motors in case of diesel-electric locomotives.

 100–199 - Diesel-electric locomotives with DC motors
 200–299 - Diesel-electric locomotives with AC motors
 300–399 - Other diesel-electric locomotives
 500–799 - Diesel-hydraulic locomotives

According to this numbering method, DF200-7 means locomotive number 7 of Class DF200, which is a class of diesel-electric locomotive with six driving axles and AC electric motors.

Shinkansen 
Diesel locomotives used on the Shinkansen system (for track maintenance and depot use) are numbered with three-digit class names followed by a serial number connected with a hyphen. There have been two classes of diesel locomotives for shinkansen use: 911 and 912.

In the uniform classification system for Shinkansen rolling stock, the first digit 9 is assigned for cars and locomotives for  departmental use. In this 9XX group, the second digit 1 is used for diesel locomotives.

Hybrid locomotives 

In 2010, JR Freight classified its first diesel-battery hybrid locomotive HD300. The class name HD300 was explained as follows.
H - hybrid locomotive
D - number of driving axles being four
300 - type of main motor being synchronous motor

References 
 Exhibition of Railway Museum: Number Plate  

 JR Group Locomotives and Rolling Stock Classification - Japanese Railway Society 

Locomotive classification systems
Locomotives of Japan